James Frothingham (1786–1864)

was an American portrait painter in Massachusetts and New York. He was the father of Sarah C. Frothingham.

Life and work
James Frothingham was born in Charlestown, Massachusetts. He began as a chaise painter in his father's chaise manufactory. In the Boston area, he was a student of Gilbert Stuart. In 1888, The Atlantic Monthly described him as "a portraitist of talent", adding that Stuart is quoted as having said of one of Frothingham's head portraits, "No man in Boston but myself can paint so good a head," and that Frothingham was greatly helped by Stuart's criticisms and encouragement, although initially his Nestor had advised him to adopt another, less precarious means of earning a livelihood.

The Atlantic noted that there is a detailed portrait of Samuel Dexter by Frothingham in the Harvard Memorial Hall, in which Dexter, wearing a white wig and a red cloak atop a black coat, holds a book in his hand, and appears lost in meditation, saying the flesh coloring in the painting is rather dry and parchment-like, but overall, the color is harmonious. Dunlap noted that heads depicted by James Frothingham were painted with great truth, freedom, and excellence.

He painted a number of likenesses in Salem, including the wealthy merchant Elias Hasket Derby. Frothingham would have been a regional competitor to the younger Chester Harding (1792–1866), but in 1826 moved to Brooklyn in New York City.

In 1828 he was elected into the National Academy of Design as an Associate member, and became a full Academician in 1831.

Frothingham was the subject of a portrait bust by Joanna Quiner. His own portrait of her is held by the Beverly Public Library in Beverly, Massachusetts.

Selection of portraits

See also
 Francis Alexander (1800–1880) – American painter who moved to Boston.
 John Burgum – ornamental painter, co-worker.
 John Coles (1776/1780-1854) – portrait/heraldic painter, friend of James Frothingham, also studied under Gilbert Stuart.

Notes

References
 "Chester Harding (1792–1866)" (biography), Worcester Art, webpage: WorcArt-Harding.
 "Boston Painters and Paintings" (old article), The Atlantic Monthly, Volume 62, Issue 370, August 1888, LOC webpage: LOC-AMonthly-Boston.
  Has 1781 as birth year, and Charleston as birthplace.

External links

1786 births
1864 deaths
18th-century American painters
18th-century American male artists
American male painters
19th-century American painters
Artists from Massachusetts
Painters from New York City
People from Charlestown, Boston
19th-century American male artists